USCGC Tampa has been the name of four cutters of the United States Revenue Cutter Service and United States Coast Guard:

 , served as cutter USRC Miami in the U.S. Revenue Cutter Service 1912-1915, as Coast Guard cutter USCGC Miami 1915-1916, as Coast Guard cutter USCGC Tampa 1916-1917, and in the U.S. Navy as USS Tampa 1917-1918, and was sunk by a German submarine in 1918.
 , a  active 1947 to 1954, originally the 
 , a medium endurance cutter commissioned in 1984 and active today.

See also
 

United States Coast Guard ship names